Seo Do-young is a South Korean actor.

Career 
Seo Do-young was a promising model before he began his acting career, appearing in numerous runways for the Korea's leading fashion designers as well as several foreign designer shows such as Gucci, Dolce & Gabbana and Tommy Hilfiger. During his years as a model, he enrolled in acting classes in pursuit of his ultimate goal, to be an actor. After taking some supporting roles and appearing on TV commercials, he was cast—to everyone's surprise—as the leading actor for the Spring Waltz, the fourth and final feature of the season-themed drama series by TV director Yoon Seok-ho.

Filmography

Television series 
 Want a Taste? (SBS, 2019–20)
 Gangnam Scandal (SBS, 2018-2019)
 Reverse (MBC, 2017)
 Beautiful You (MBC, 2015)
 Miss Mamma Mia (KBS, 2015)
 Enchanting Neighbor (SBS, 2015)
 Flower of Revenge (jTBC, 2013)
 My One and Only (KBS1, 2011)
 The Thorn Birds (KBSH 2, 2011)
 Yaksha (OCN, 2010)
 Invincible Lee Pyung Kang (KBS2, 2009)
 Friend, Our Legend (MBC, 2009)
 TV Novel "Spring Spring Spring" (KBS1, 2008)
 Unstoppable Marriage (KBS2, 2007)
 MBC Best Theater "Amnesia" (MBC, 2007)
 Spring Waltz (KBS2, 2006)
 Emperor of the Sea (KBS2, 2005)
 Drama City "Oh! Sarah" (KBS2, 2003)

Film 
The Poem of Jeolla (2010)

Variety show 
Real Documentary - Singles in Seoul 2: Metrosexual (OnStyle, 2004)

Awards and nominations

References

External links
Seo Do-young at GnG Productions

South Korean male television actors
South Korean male film actors
South Korean male models
1981 births
Living people